Metriogryllacris is a genus of Orthopterans, sometimes known as 'leaf-folding crickets' in the subfamily Gryllacridinae, tribe Gryllacridini and the genus group Metriogryllacrae Cadena-Castañeda, 2019.  The recorded distribution is currently: Japan, Korea, China, Vietnam and Java and Sulawesi in Malesia.

Species 
The Orthoptera Species File lists:
subgenus Metriogryllacris Karny, 1937
 species group amitarum (Griffini, 1914)
 Metriogryllacris amitarum (Griffini, 1914)
 Metriogryllacris distincta Gorochov, 2004
 Metriogryllacris nigrilimbis Liu & Bian, 2021
 species group fida Gorochov, 2002
 Metriogryllacris comes Gorochov, 2002
 Metriogryllacris fasciata (Ichikawa, 2001)
 Metriogryllacris fida Gorochov, 2002
 Metriogryllacris tigris Kim, 2014
 species group gialai Gorochov, 2004
 Metriogryllacris alia Gorochov, 2004
 Metriogryllacris gialai Gorochov, 2004
 Metriogryllacris microptila Gorochov, 2004
 species group permodesta (Griffini, 1914)
 Metriogryllacris bavi Gorochov, 2004
 Metriogryllacris darevskyi Gorochov, 2004
 Metriogryllacris orlovi Gorochov, 2004
 Metriogryllacris permodesta (Griffini, 1914) - type species (as Gryllacris permodesta Griffini; locality: Mau Son Mountain, Lang Son Province, Vietnam)
 Metriogryllacris tamdao Gorochov, 2004
 species group not assigned: Metriogryllacris libera (Karny, 1929)
subgenus Xiphilarnaca Ingrisch, 2018
 monotypic Metriogryllacris xiphiura (Karny, 1928) from Java

References

External links
Photo at iNaturalist

Ensifera genera
Gryllacrididae
Orthoptera of Indo-China
Orthoptera of Malesia